Tuamarina (often spelled Tua Marina) is a small town in Marlborough, New Zealand. State Highway 1 runs through the area. The Tuamarina River joins the Wairau River just south of the settlement. Picton is about 18 km to the north, and Blenheim is about 10 km to the south.

The name is a corruption of the Māori word Tuamarino, which means 'the calm beyond'. Dairy farming is the major economic activity, and the Koromiko cheese factory won a number of awards  before it was destroyed by fire in 2004.

The Wairau Affray occurred in the area in 1843, resulting in 26 deaths.

The Wairau Plain is prone to flooding, and river conservation is necessary to keep the river under control. Significant floods have occurred in the Tuamarina area, such as one in December 1939.

Demographics

The settlement had a population of 237 at the 2018 New Zealand census, an increase of 15 people (6.8%) since the 2013 census, and a decrease of 30 people (-11.2%) since the 2006 census. There were 87 households. There were 117 males and 120 females, giving a sex ratio of 0.97 males per female. The median age was 45.8 years (compared with 37.4 years nationally), with 48 people (20.3%) aged under 15 years, 30 (12.7%) aged 15 to 29, 123 (51.9%) aged 30 to 64, and 39 (16.5%) aged 65 or older.

Ethnicities were 94.9% European/Pākehā, 12.7% Māori, 2.5% Asian, and 2.5% other ethnicities (totals add to more than 100% since people could identify with multiple ethnicities).

Although some people objected to giving their religion, 63.3% had no religion, 27.8% were Christian and 1.3% had other religions.

Of those at least 15 years old, 30 (15.9%) people had a bachelor or higher degree, and 33 (17.5%) people had no formal qualifications. The median income was $41,200, compared with $31,800 nationally. The employment status of those at least 15 was that 120 (63.5%) people were employed full-time, 24 (12.7%) were part-time, and 0 (0.0%) were unemployed.

Tuamarina statistical area
Tuamarina statistical area surrounds the settlement and also includes Rārangi.

Tuamarina had a population of 1,263 at the 2018 New Zealand census, an increase of 78 people (6.6%) since the 2013 census, and an increase of 171 people (15.7%) since the 2006 census. There were 477 households. There were 633 males and 633 females, giving a sex ratio of 1.0 males per female. The median age was 46.4 years (compared with 37.4 years nationally), with 249 people (19.7%) aged under 15 years, 162 (12.8%) aged 15 to 29, 648 (51.3%) aged 30 to 64, and 207 (16.4%) aged 65 or older.

Ethnicities were 92.6% European/Pākehā, 13.1% Māori, 1.9% Pacific peoples, 1.2% Asian, and 2.1% other ethnicities (totals add to more than 100% since people could identify with multiple ethnicities).

The proportion of people born overseas was 17.1%, compared with 27.1% nationally.

Although some people objected to giving their religion, 63.4% had no religion, 25.7% were Christian, 0.2% were Hindu, 0.5% were Buddhist and 1.7% had other religions.

Of those at least 15 years old, 186 (18.3%) people had a bachelor or higher degree, and 174 (17.2%) people had no formal qualifications. The median income was $35,100, compared with $31,800 nationally. The employment status of those at least 15 was that 576 (56.8%) people were employed full-time, 150 (14.8%) were part-time, and 21 (2.1%) were unemployed.

Education
Tua Marina School is a coeducational full primary (years 1–8) school with a decile rating of 7 and a roll of 86. The school celebrated its 100th anniversary in 1971.

Notable people
Eileen Duggan, 1894–1972, poet.

Notes

Populated places in the Marlborough Region